"Blue Lips" is a single by American experimental rock band Bear Hands featuring backing vocals from Ursula Rose.

Charts

References

2019 songs
2019 singles
Bear Hands songs